The Microsoft Excel Collegiate Challenge (MECC) is a Microsoft Excel esports competition, sponsored by Microsoft. Started in 2021, the competition is a spin-off of the Financial Modeling World Cup for college students. Contestants solve problems, in the form of case studies, using the spreadsheet software. Competitors are ranked through multiple rounds of timed competition, including an in-person final round. Participants may compete in either individuals or teams. The competition is jointly organized by the Eller College of Management and Financial Modeling World Cup.

Background 
Similar financial modeling competitions have been run in the past, including the also-Microsoft-sponsored ModelOff Financial Modeling World Championships from 2012 to 2019. The collegiate competition has been run by the same organizers as the Financial Modeling World Cup, which holds monthly online contests and occasional "battles" broadcast live.

In each round, competitors solve problems presented as one-to-five-page-long financial modeling case studies with questions at the end, using Microsoft Excel.

The first in-person and live Excel battles were held in the Arizona Esports Arena on December 3, 2022.

2022 Competition 
In 2022, 2,730 students from 93 countries and 596 universities and colleges competed in the competition. The event was held at the University of Arizona, which was live streamed and aired on ESPNU.

References

External links 
 Official website

Esports competitions
Microsoft Office
Finance